AV (Akademische Verbindung; academic society) Fryburgia is a fraternity or Studentenverbindung at the University of Fribourg in Switzerland. Male students of all faculties are eligible to become members. The fraternity is a section of the Schweizerischer Studentenverein (Swiss Student's Society; SSS).

History 
In the early years of the 20th century, fraternity life in Europe became more and more time consuming. Fraternity students had to be present at a large number of festivities such as balls, kneipen and kommerse. This cost time and money which the students would have needed for their studies – idle semesters with no actual study success were common. The very strict rules and the obligation to consume alcohol in these fraternities made it even more difficult to follow a meaningful daily routine at university and the reputation of the students was very bad. Because of these reasons, some of the members of the AKV Alemannia – another still existing fraternity in Fribourg – decided in 1918 to separate and to found a new fraternity, the AV Fryburgia. 
The AV Fryburgia was therewith the second “reform” fraternity in Switzerland, following AV Berchtoldia (in Bern) and followed by AV Welfen (in Zurich) and AV Froburger (in Basel). The goals of these fraternities were to concentrate more on science, religion and social responsibility. Some old fraternity traditions who were seen as superfluous were abandoned, others maintained. The infamous “trinkzwang” – forced drinking – was abandoned.

The importance of the fraternity grew and until the 1970s it was one of the big and dominant fraternities in Fribourg and in the Swiss Student Society. It only suffered – as did all other fraternities in Switzerland – during World War II when large numbers of students were drafted for military service. Around the war years some members separated from AV Fryburgia in order to form new fraternities, the AV Staufer in 1937 and the CA Rezia in 1957. Unlike the separation from the AKV Alemannia, these fraternities separated in good terms.

During the 1980, the AV Fryburgia became the first and only fraternity in Switzerland to have two members of the Swiss Federal Council at the same time, Kurt Furgler and Hans Hürlimann.

Today the fraternity still occasionally opposes to the conservative mainstream inside the SSS. In autumn 2010 it declined a communiqué of the Council of the SSS in which the latter objected to the so-called scholarship initiative of the VSS-UNES-USU and is now a partnership organization of the initiative, which is demanding a popular vote in Switzerland on the scholarship policy of Switzerland.

Basic principles and identification

Basic principles 
AV Fryburgia is part of the so-called “reform”. Although it does have certain drinking traditions, there is no mandatory drinking. The activities of the fraternity shall be limited to a reasonable amount. The centre of fraternity life is the weekly Stammtisch (“regular’s table”) which is a mandatory event for the members. Quick and successful accomplishment of the studies is promoted, as well as sports.

The fraternity bears colors and rejects the tradition of student fencing as being inconsistent with Christian ideas as well as pomposity such as the use of horses on parades (i.e. the Corpus Christi procession).

Motto 
The Motto of the fraternity is „Treu, ehrlich und stolz!“ (short: T.e.u.s.!; „Loyal, honest and proud!“). It declares the valors which should guide the members.

Coat of arms 
The coat of arms of the fraternity is divided into six parts. Behind the colors and the monogram it displays in the upper half the colors of the SSS (red-white-green), the Swiss cross and the raising sun (last sentence of the fraternities anthem: “Sonne, Sonne, ringe Dich durch!” – lit. “The sun shall prevail”). In the lower half it shows the ancient seal of the University of Fribourg and the coat of arms of the City of Fribourg.

Anthem 
The anthem was written for the fraternity by famous Swiss composer Abbé Joseph Bovet (who also composed „Our chalet“, a song of the French Resistance). It is one of the very few student anthems with an own melody.
De clair soleil, la tête auréolée
au fond du coeur la flamme du devoir
chantons leurs airs, en joyeuse envolée
dans ses murs gris, Fribourg aime a les voir:

Fryburgia, Fryburgia, c'est toi, c'est ta cohorte
preux troubadours, servants de l'idéal
dont la devise, impérative et forte
s'en va quérir l'astre à l'éclat royal!

Sonne, Sonne, ringe Dich durch!
Sonne, Sonne, ringe Dich durch!

Notable members (selection) 
 Urs Altermatt (*1942), historian, professor at the University of Fribourg
 Marc Amstutz (*1962), professor of commercial law at the University of Fribourg
 Daniel Anrig, President of the Supreme Court of the Canton of Glarus
 Mario Cavigelli (*1965), Member of government (CVP) of Grisons
 Kurt Furgler (*1924, †2008), former Member of the Swiss Federal Council and President of the Swiss Confederation (CVP)
 Hans Hürlimann (*1918, †1994), former Member of the Swiss Federal Council and President of the Swiss Confederation (CVP)
 Marcel Alexander Niggli (*1960), Dean of the Law School of the University of Fribourg and professor of criminal law and philosophy of law
 Johannes Baptist Rösler (*1922, †2009), German politician and former member of the German Bundestag (CDU)
 Hubert Stöckli (*1966), professor of civil and trade law at the University of Fribourg
 Hans Wiprächtiger (*1943), former member (until 2011) of the Supreme Court of Switzerland (SP)

External links

References 

Fryburgia, AV
Fryburgia, AV

Student organizations established in 1918
1918 establishments in Switzerland